Colonel Edmund William Cole (July 19, 1827 – May 25, 1899) was an American Confederate veteran and businessman. He was the president of the Nashville, Chattanooga and St. Louis Railway, and the founder of the American National Bank.

Early life
Edmund William Cole was born on July 19, 1827, in Giles County, Tennessee. He grew up on a farm.

Career
Cole moved to Nashville, Tennessee in 1845, where he worked as a store clerk and later as a bookkeeper in the post office. In 1857, he was appointed as the superintendent of the Nashville & Chattanooga Railroad by its founder, Vernon K. Stevenson.

During the American Civil War of 1861–1865, Cole served as a colonel in the Confederate States Army. General Samuel Jones described Cole as "active and zealous" during the war.

Cole was appointed as the president of the Nashville & Chattanooga Railroad in 1868. Cole acquired four more lines and renamed it the Nashville, Chattanooga and St. Louis Railway in 1873. According to historian Jesse C. Burt, Jr., "His grandiose scheme for uniting disparate pieces of rail properties into a solid and well-managed enterprise was probably the first large rail consolidation to be attempted in the South." When August Belmont purchased it from Stevenson in 1880, Cole resigned, and he was succeeded as president by James D. Porter.

Cole co-founded the American National Bank in 1883. He also invested in real estate in Downtown Nashville and coal mines in Sheffield, Alabama. He was also an investor in the Sheffield Hotel, where he banned the sale of whisky.

Philanthropy

In 1885, Cole founded the Randall Cole School, and he hired Dr W. C. Kilvington as superintendent. In 1887, Cole donated it to the state of Tennessee, and it was renamed the Tennessee Industrial School. In 1894, it moved into the Anna Russell Cole Auditorium, named for Cole's second wife.

Cole served as the treasurer of the board of trust of Vanderbilt University. In 1892, he donated $5,000 to endow the annual Cole Lecture, "for the defense and advocacy of the Christian religion."

Cole made a donation to the Bruce family shortly after the Lynching of Ephraim Grizzard in 1892.

Personal life, death and legacy
Cole was married twice. His first wife, Louisa McGavock, died in 1869; her funeral ceremony was conducted by reverends John Berry McFerrin and Robert A. Young. They lived at 182 Church Street. His second wife, Anna Russell, was a native of Augusta, Georgia whose father had served as the first Democratic mayor of Augusta after the Civil War. Their wedding, conducted by Bishop Holland Nimmons McTyeire, was attended by Confederate veterans Bushrod Johnson and Edmund Kirby Smith. The Coles first resided at Terrace Place, a three-story townhouse on Church Street in Nashville, until they moved into Colemere, a mansion designed for them by Confederate veteran and architect William Crawford Smith. They had a son, Whitefoord Russell Cole, who became a prominent businessman. Cole was a member of the Democratic Party, and he attended the McKendree United Methodist Church.

Cole died of heart disease on May 25, 1899 at the Fifth Avenue Hotel in New York City. His funeral was held at the McKendree United Methodist Church in Nashville. After his death, his widow hired sculptor George Julian Zolnay to design his bust; it was installed in Kirkland Hall, the administration building of Vanderbilt University. When Kirkland Hall burned down in 1905, it was replaced with a marble bust alongside his widow's portrait by Willie Betty Newman.

References

External links
 

1827 births
1899 deaths
People from Giles County, Tennessee
People from Nashville, Tennessee
Confederate States Army personnel
Businesspeople from Tennessee
American bankers
Philanthropists from Tennessee
McGavock family
19th-century American philanthropists
19th-century American businesspeople